Joan Gibson Cottrill is an Australian former tennis player of the 1960s.

Gibson, a double-handed player, comes from a tennis family, as a niece of Jack Crawford and brother of Neil Gibson.

In 1966 she reached the quarter-finals of the Australian Championships with an upset win over the third-seeded Lesley Turner. She also made the mixed doubles semi-finals that year, partnering future husband John Cottrill.

Gibson had a top national ranking of three, behind Margaret Court and Lesley Turner.

References

Year of birth missing (living people)
Living people
Australian female tennis players
20th-century Australian women